Panchadara Chilaka is a 1999 Indian Telugu-language romantic drama film directed by Kodi Ramakrishna, starring Srikanth and Kausalya. It is a remake of the 1980 Tamil film Oru Thalai Ragam.

Plot

Cast 
Srikanth as Murali
Kausalya as Kalyani
Prithvi as Prithvi
M. S. Narayana as college principal
Ali as Ali
Naveen Choudhary as Jagan
Renuka as Kalyani's elder sister

Production 
The film was shot at Araku Valley and Ramoji Film City.

Soundtrack

Reception 
Griddaluru Gopalrao of Zamin Ryot gave the film a negative review, criticising the plot and characterisations as illogical and insipid. He also criticised the direction of Kodi Ramakrishna, but noted that the music and lyrics were good.

References

External links 
 

1990s Telugu-language films
1999 romantic drama films
Films directed by Kodi Ramakrishna
Films scored by S. A. Rajkumar
Films with screenplays by Mullapudi Venkata Ramana
Indian romantic drama films
Telugu remakes of Tamil films